Lieutenant General Kjell Gustav Nilsson (2 August 1943 – 12 January 2018) was a Swedish Air Force officer, ice hockey player and sports administrator. Nilsson's senior commands includes commander of the Northern Air Command (1995–1996), Chief of Staff of the Northern Military District (1996–1998), and Chief of Joint Operations Command (1998–2000). Nilsson served as chairman of the Swedish Ice Hockey Association from June 2002 to June 2004.

Career

Military career
Nilsson began his military career as an air force officer candidate in 1964 at the Swedish Air Force Flying School in Ljungbyhed. Nilsson was commissioned as an officer in the Swedish Air Force in 1967 as second lieutenant. He was promoted to lieutenant in 1969 and to captain in 1972. Nilsson served as squadron commander at Bråvalla Wing in Norrköping from 1973 to 1976. During his career, Nilsson flew, among others, J 28 Vampire, Saab 29 Tunnan, Saab 32 Lansen, Saab 35 Draken and Saab 37 Viggen. He was promoted to major in 1978 and to lieutenant colonel in 1983. From 1984 to 1986, he was head of the Aviation Unit at Uppland Wing and from 1986 to 1987, Nilsson served as head of the Aviation Service Detail (Flygtjänstdetaljen)  the Air Staff. From 1988 to 1989 he was head of the Personnel Administration Department in the Air Staff and from 1989 to 1990, he studied at the Air War College in United States. Nilsson was promoted to colonel in 1990 and served as Deputy Sector Wing Commander and Wing Commander of Uppland Wing (F 16/Se M) in Uppsala.

In 1992, Nilsson was promoted to senior colonel and he then served from 1992 to 1994 as head of the Production Command (Produktionsledningen) in the Air Staff. From 1993 to 1994 he was Acting Chief of the Air Staff. From 1994 to 1995, Nilsson was head of the Production Department in the Air Force Command and from 1995 to 1996, he was head of the Northern Air Command (Norra flygkommandot). In 1996, Nilsson was promoted to major general and was appointed Chief of Staff of the Northern Military District. Two years later, on 1 July 1998, Nilsson was promoted to lieutenant general and was appointed Chief of the Joint Operations Command (Operationsledningen, OPL). He retired from active service in 2000.

Sports career
Nilsson began his hockey career in Värmland where he represented IFK Bofors. He was seen early on as a great talent who also played for Värmland who won the TV-pucken's premiere year in 1959. Later in his career, he represented AIK and Rögle, among others. In the latter club he was also chairman from 2005 to 2009.

Personal life
He was married to Maud from Karlskoga and they had two children. Nilsson lived in Vallentuna where he was the coach of Vallentuna hockey school, youth team, junior and senior team.

Death
Nilsson died on 12 January 2018 in Stockholm. The funeral took place on 9 February 2018 in Barkåkra Church, Ängelholm.

Dates of rank
1967 – Second lieutenant
1969 – Lieutenant
1972 – Captain
1978 – Major
1983 – Lieutenant colonel
1990 – Colonel
1992 – Senior colonel
1996 – Major general
1998 – Lieutenant general

References

External links

1943 births
2018 deaths
Swedish Air Force lieutenant generals
People from Karlskoga Municipality
BIK Karlskoga players
Rögle BK players
AIK IF players
Swedish ice hockey coaches
Swedish ice hockey administrators